Neritina (common name: nerite snails), is a genus of small aquatic snails with an operculum in the family Neritidae, the nerites.

Neritina is the type genus of the tribe Neritinini.

Species 
Species in the genus Neritina include:

 † Neritina aloeodus F. Sandberger, 1860 
 † Neritina ambrosana Stephenson in Stephenson & Stenzel, 1952 
 Neritina arcifer Mörch, 1872
 Neritina asperulata (Récluz, 1843)
 † Neritina bannisteri Meek, 1873 
 † Neritina baptista White, 1878 
 † Neritina baueri Stanton, 1916 
 Neritina beckii (Récluz, 1841)
 † Neritina bellatula Meek, 1873 
 † Neritina bidens F. Sandberger, 1870 
 † Neritina brevispira F. Sandberger, 1871 
 † Neritina brongnartina Matheron, 1843 
 † Neritina bruneri White, 1882 
 Neritina canalis G. B. Sowerby I, 1825
 † Neritina carditoides Meek, 1873 
 Neritina cenomanensis Repelin, 1902 
 Neritina cornuta Reeve, 1856
 † Neritina disparilis Vincent, 1930 
 † Neritina edentula Dall, 1892 
 † Neritina elephantina Wesselingh, 2003 
 † Neritina etheridgei Roxo, 1924 
 Neritina exclamationis Mabille, 1895
 † Neritina fischeri Brunner, 1848 
 † † Neritina fulminifera F. Sandberger, 1861 
 † Neritina gentili Pallary, 1901 
 Neritina hamuligera Troschel, 1837
 † Neritina headonensis (Symonds, 2006) 
 † Neritina hoeseltensis (Marquet et al., 2008) 
 Neritina immersa E. von Martens, 1861
 † Neritina inequidentata Recluz, 1850 
 † Neritina inornata F. Sandberger, 1870 
 † Neritina insolita Stephenson in Stephenson & Stenzel, 1952 
 Neritina iris Mousson, 1849
 Neritina janetabbasae Eichhorst, 2016
 Neritina knorri (Récluz, 1841)
 † Neritina lautricensis (Noulet, 1857) 
 † Neritina levesquei Récluz, 1850 
 † Neritina linthae (Locard, 1893)
 † Neritina lutea Zittel, 1863 
 † Neritina malescoti Vasseur, 1882 
 † Neritina mariae Handmann, 1887 
 † Neritina maxwellorum Beu & B. A. Marshall, 2011 
 † Neritina narbonensis (Noulet, 1858)
 † Neritina ortoni Woodward, 1871 
 † Neritina pacchiana Palmer, 1941
 † Neritina pachyderma Sandberger, 1875 
 † Neritina patricknuttalli Wesselingh, 2003 
 Neritina petitii (Récluz, 1841)
 † Neritina philippsoni Oppenheim, 1894 
 † Neritina pilisensis (Báldi, 1973) 
 Neritina porcata A. Gould, 1847
 Neritina powisiana (Récluz, 1843)
 † Neritina primordialis Repelin, 1902 
 Neritina pulligera (Linnaeus, 1767) - type species
 † Neritina puncta Etheridge, 1879 
 † Neritina roxoi de Greve, 1938 
 † Neritina sanctifelicis Doncieux, 1908 
 Neritina sandalina (Récluz, 1842)
 Neritina sanguinea G. B. Sowerby II, 1849
 Neritina squamaepicta (Récluz, 1843)
 † Neritina squamulifera Sandberger, 1872 
 † Neritina staffinensis Forbes, 1851 
 Neritina stumpffi Boettger, 1890
 † Neritina subangularis Sandberger, 1860 
 † Neritina supraoligocaenica (Báldi, 1973) 
 Neritina tingitana Pallary, 1899 (taxon inquirendum)
 Neritina turbida Morelet, 1849 (taxon inquirednum)
 † Neritina veldiensis (Roemer, 1839) 
 † Neritina vetranici (Brusina, 1902) 
 † Neritina volvilineata White, 1876 
 Neritina zigzag Lamarck, 1822

Species brought into synonymy
 Neritina adansoniana (Récluz, 1841): synonym of Vitta adansoniana (Récluz, 1841) (new combination)
 Neritina afra G.B. Sowerby I, 1841: synonym of Nereina afra (G. B. Sowerby I, 1836) (original combination)
 Neritina anatolica (Récluz, 1841): synonym of Theodoxus anatolicus (Récluz, 1841) (superseded combination)
 Neritina cariosa (Wood, 1828): synonym of Neripteron cariosum (W. Wood, 1828)
 Neritina clenchi Russell, 1940: synonym of Vitta clenchi (Russell, 1940) (new combination)
 Neritina comorensis Morelet, 1877: synonym of Clithon chlorostoma (G. B. Sowerby I, 1833)
 Neritina consimilis Martens, 1879: synonym of Neritilia rubida (Pease, 1865)
 Neritina cornucopia Benson, 1836: synonym of Neripteron cornucopia (Benson, 1836)
 Neritina cristata Morelet, 1864: synonym of Vitta cristata (Morelet, 1864)
 Neritina euphratica Mousson, 1874: synonym of Theodoxus jordani (Sowerby I, 1836)
 Neritina flexuosa Hombron & Jacquinot, 1848: synonym of Clithon corona (Linnaeus, 1758)
 Neritina flexuosa Gassies, 1878: synonym of Clithon nouletianus (Gassies, 1863)
 Neritina gagates (Lamarck, 1822): synonym of Vittina gagates (Lamarck, 1822)
 Neritina glabrata Sowerby, 1849: synonym of Vitta glabrata (G. B. Sowerby II, 1849)
 Neritina granosa G.B. Sowerby I, 1825: synonym of Neritona granosa (G. B. Sowerby I, 1825)
 Neritina hellvillensis Crosse, 1881: synonym of Smaragdia souverbiana (Montrouzier, 1863)
 Neritina horrida Mabille, 1895: synonym of Clithon diadema (Récluz, 1841)
 Neritina juttingae (Mienis, 1973) - hedgehog nerite: synonym of Neritona juttingae (Mienis, 1973)
 Neritina kuramoensis Yoloye & Adegoke, 1977: synonym of Vitta kuramoensis (Yoloye & Adegoke, 1977)
 Neritina manoeli (Dohrn, 1866): synonym of Neritilia manoeli (Dohrn, 1866)
 Neritina mauriciae (Lesson, 1831): synonym of Neripteron mauriciae (Lesson, 1831)
 Neritina mauritiana Morelet, 1867: synonym of Clithon coronatum (Leach, 1815)
 Neritina meleagris (Lamarck, 1822): synonym of Vitta meleagris (Lamarck, 1822)
 Neritina natalensis Reeve, 1855: synonym of Vittina natalensis (Reeve, 1855)
 Neritina nouletiana Gassies, 1863: synonym of Clithon nouletianus (Gassies, 1863)
 Neritina oweniana (Wood, 1828): synonym of Clypeolum owenianum (W. Wood, 1828)
 Neritina perfecta Mabille, 1895: synonym of Clithon bicolor (Récluz, 1843)
 Neritina piratica Russell, 1940: synonym of Vitta piratica (Russell, 1940)
 Neritina ponsoti Pallary, 1930: synonym of Theodoxus jordani (G. B. Sowerby I, 1836)
 Neritina pulcherrima Angas, 1871: synonym of Smaragdia souverbiana (Montrouzier, 1863)
 Neritina punctulata Lamarck, 1816: synonym of Nereina punctulata (Lamarck, 1816)
 Neritina pusilla C.B. Adams, 1850: synonym of Neritilia pusilla (C.B. Adams, 1850)
 Neritina pygmaea C.B. Adams, 1845: synonym of Neritilia succinea (Récluz, 1841)
 Neritina rangiana Récluz, 1841: synonym of Smaragdia rangiana (Recluz, 1841)
 Neritina reclivata (Say, 1822) - olive nerite: synonym of Neritina usnea (Röding, 1798): synonym of Vitta usnea (Röding, 1798)
 Neritina retusa Morelet, 1853: synonym of Clithon bicolor (Récluz, 1843)
 Neritina rubida Pease, 1865: synonym of Neritilia rubida (Pease, 1865)
 Neritina rubricata Morelet, 1858: synonym of Vitta rubricata (Morelet, 1858)
 Neritina souverbieana Montrouzier, 1863: synonym of Smaragdia souverbiana (Montrouzier, 1863)
 Neritina tiassalensis Binder, 1955: synonym of Clypeolum owenianum (W. Wood, 1828)
 Neritina turrita (Gmelin, 1791): synonym of Vittina turrita (Gmelin, 1791)
 Neritina unidentata Récluz, 1850: synonym of Clithon corona (Linnaeus, 1758) 
 Neritina usnea (Roding, 1798) - olive nerite: synonym of Vitta usnea (Röding, 1798)
 Neritina violacea (Gmelin, 1791): synonym of Neripteron violaceum (Gmelin, 1791)
 Neritina virginea (Linnaeus, 1758) - virgin nerite: synonym of Vitta virginea (Linnaeus, 1758)
 Neritina zebra (Bruguière, 1792): synonym of Vitta zebra (Bruguière, 1792)

References 

 Lamarck J.B. (1816). Liste des objets représentés dans les planches de cette livraison. In: Tableau encyclopédique et méthodique des trois règnes de la Nature. Mollusques et Polypes divers. Agasse, Paris. 16 pp.
 Vaught, K.C. (1989). A classification of the living Mollusca. American Malacologists: Melbourne, FL (USA). . XII, 195 pp
 Eichhorst T.E. (2016). Neritidae of the world. Volume 2. Harxheim: Conchbooks. Pp. 696-1366

External links 
 Gray, J. E. (1847). A list of the genera of recent Mollusca, their synonyma and types. Proceedings of the Zoological Society of London. (1847) 15: 129-219

Neritidae
Taxa named by Constantine Samuel Rafinesque
Taxonomy articles created by Polbot